Anna Mainardi Fava (10 July 1933 – 17 March 2003) was an Italian politician. She was a member of the Chamber of Deputies from 1983 to 1992, representing the Italian Communist Party and the Democratic Party of the Left.

Early life 
Mainardi Fava was born on 10 July 1933, in Salsomaggiore Terme. She served as mayor of Salsomaggiore Terme and then as a member of the regional committee for Fidenza and as a member of the leadership committee for the region. She was a member of the regional and national committee of the Italian Communist Party (PCI).

Political career 
She was first elected to the Chamber of Deputies for Parma–Modena–Piacenza–Reggio Calabria in the 1983 general election on 6 July 1983, as a member of the PCI. She was a member of the 14th commission on hygiene and public health. Mainardi Fava was re-elected in the 1987 general election on 25 June 1987. She was a member of the XII commission on social affairs. She was a member for the PCI until the party dissolved when she joined the Democratic Party of the Left (PDS) on 13 February 1991. She left office on 22 April 1992.

References 

1933 births
2003 deaths
Deputies of Legislature X of Italy
Deputies of Legislature IX of Italy
Democratic Party of the Left politicians
Italian Communist Party politicians
20th-century Italian women politicians